Belhassen is a family name frequent in Tunisia. It may refer to:

 Belhassen Aloui (born 1973), Tunisian footballer
 Belhassen Oueslati, current Tunisia's military speaker
 Belhassen Trabelsi, Tunisian businessman

See also
 Joël Bellassen (born 1950), French linguist
 Laurent Belissen (1693–1762), French Baroque composer